HD 118889 is a binary star system in the northern constellation of Boötes. It is faintly visible to the naked eye as a point of light with an apparent visual magnitude of 5.57. The system is located at a distance of approximately 196 light years from the Sun based on stellar parallax, but is drifting closer with a radial velocity of −26 km/s.

The binary components of this system were first measured by S. W. Burnham in 1878 and it was given the discovery code BU 612. The pair are orbiting each other with a period of 22.46 years with an eccentricity (ovalness) of 0.545. The primary component is a magnitude 6.35 star with a stellar classification of F0V, matching an F-type main-sequence star. It is an estimated 718 million years old and is spinning rapidly with a projected rotational velocity of 144 km/s. The star has 1.4–1.9 times the mass of the Sun. The secondary is slightly fainter at magnitude 6.47.

References

External links
 HR 5138
 CCDM J13395+1045
 Image HD 118889

F-type main-sequence stars
Binary stars
Boötes
Durchmusterung objects
118889
066640
5138